Manchama is a village in tehsil Beerwah of the district Budgam of the Jammu and Kashmir.

See also 
Chewdara
Rathsoon
Ohangam
Meerpora

References 

Villages in Budgam district